Countess Élaine Marie Joseph Charlotte de Greffulhe (19 March 1882 – 11 February 1958), who became the Duchess of Gramont by marriage, was a French aristocrat. She was a descendant of Hortense Mancini. Through her grandaughter's Pauline Félicité de Mailly son Charles de Vintimille, duc de Luc

Early life

Élaine was born on 19 March 1882 in Paris.  She was the daughter, and heiress, of Count Henry Greffulhe and his wife, Élisabeth de Riquet de Caraman-Chimay (said to be a model for the Duchess of Guermantes in Marcel Proust’s novel, À la recherche du temps perdu).

Personal life
In 1904, she married Armand de Gramont, who later became the 12th Duke of Gramont.  His parents were Agénor de Gramont, 11th Duke of Gramont and the former Marguerite de Rothschild.  A rare film clip may show Proust (in bowler hat and gray coat) at her wedding in 1904. Proust’s wedding gift to the groom was apparently a revolver in a leather case inscribed with verses from her childhood poems. Czar Nicholas II of Russia sent her a gift in honor of their 1904 marriage.  Together, Élaine and Armand were the parents of:

 Antoine Agénor Henri Armand de Gramont, 13th Duke of Gramont (1907–1995), who married Odile Marguerite Marie Marthe Madeleine Sublet d'Heudicourt de Lenoncourt.
 Comte Jean Armand Antoine de Gramont (1909–1994), who married Ghislaine Meunier du Houssoy.
 Comte Charles Louis Antoine Armand de Gramont (b. 1911), who married Shermine Baras
 Corisande Marguerite Elisabeth de Gramont (b. 1920), who married Comte Jean-Louis de Maigret.

Élaine died in Paris on 11 February 1958.

References

External links
 

1882 births
1958 deaths
Nobility from Paris
Dukes of Gramont